HD 44780 is a binary star system in the northern constellation of Gemini, located about 3° north of Mu Geminorum. The pair have a combined apparent visual magnitude of 6.35, which is near the lower limit of visibility to the naked eye. Although it is above magnitude 6.5, it was not included in the Bright Star Catalogue; the designation HD 44780 comes from the Henry Draper catalogue. Based upon parallax measurements, the system is located at a distance of approximately 960 light years from the Sun. It is drifting further away with a radial velocity of +17 km/s.

The variable velocity of this system was first noted during a study at Mount Wilson observatory in 1952. Both components are similar, aging giant stars, a relatively rare combination. Their combined spectrum matches a stellar classification of K2 III; with the secondary being a slightly earlier type than the primary. They have an age of about 400 million years, with masses 3.10 and 3.02 times that of the Sun.

References

K-type giants
Spectroscopic binaries
Gemini (constellation)
Durchmusterung objects
044780
030501